Heiligengrabe is a municipality in the Ostprignitz-Ruppin district, in Brandenburg, Germany.

Geography
The municipality counts 13 villages (Ortsteil): Blandikow, Blesendorf, Blumenthal, Grabow bei Blumenthal, Herzsprung, Jabel, Königsberg, Liebenthal, Maulbeerwalde, Papenbruch, Rosenwinkel, Wernikow and Zaatzke.

Architecture

Abbey
It held an important relic in the form of a Bleeding Host which, so it was said, had been violated in a host desecration by a Jew.

The nunnery acquired considerable wealth and estates in the area, partly through the revenue from pilgrims to the Bleeding Host, and partly through donations from the noble families round about, especially when one of their daughters entered the convent. Among the nuns of local great houses were members of the families Gans zu Putlitz, von Quitzow, von Rohr, von Winterfeld and von Blumenthal. Some of the abbesses were great characters. The Abbess Henriette von Winterfeldt had a quarrel with the Duke of Mecklenburg, who refused to pay a debt to the abbey. So she borrowed a large artillery piece and declared war on Mecklenburg, bombarding it across the nearby frontier. At the time of the Lutheran Reformation, Abbess Anna von Quitzow would have nothing to do with the new denomination, and refused to pay tax.

After the Reformation the prior function of the nunnery, to provide sustenance for unmarried women mostly from local noble families, wasn't to be given up with its secularisation. So the formerly Roman Catholic nunnery turned into a Lutheran women's convent (more particular: Damenstift , literally in ), with its conventuals now called secular canonesses (Stiftsdamen). The canonesses of nobility were obliged to show sixteen quarterings in their arms before being permitted to enter.

Other infrastructures
In Heiligengrabe is the Blumenthal Observation Tower.

Demography

Gallery

References

External links

Localities in Ostprignitz-Ruppin